Patrece Ovel Liburd (born 1 March 1988) is a Kittitian footballer who plays as a defender.

Career
His career began with Bradford City before moving onto Nottingham Forest where he played in youth and reserve team games. He was then released and after a short spell on trial with Cardiff City he joined Worcester City, who were then managed by Andy Preece. After recovering from an injury he joined Dorchester Town for the remainder of the 2007–08 season. At the end of that season he was offered a 12-month contract at Dorchester and was made team captain. However, after the club went into financial difficulties in February 2009, he was released from his contract and after impressing in a trial with League Two side Macclesfield Town joined on a non-contract basis until the end of the 2008–09 season. In March 2010, Liburd signed for Droylsden after Farsley Celtic folded.

In November 2012, he joined Curzon Ashton on a free transfer from Garforth Town.

He has also played for Saint Kitts and Nevis in the 2010 FIFA World Cup qualifying games. He received his first cap in the 2010 FIFA World Cup qualification tournament for Saint Kitts and Nevis against Belize on 6 February 2008. At the youth level he played in the 2007 CONCACAF U-20 Championship.

Caps for senior national team

References

External links

1988 births
Living people
Association football defenders
Saint Kitts and Nevis footballers
Saint Kitts and Nevis international footballers
Saint Kitts and Nevis youth international footballers
Expatriate footballers in England
Worcester City F.C. players
Dorchester Town F.C. players
Macclesfield Town F.C. players
English Football League players
Bradford City A.F.C. players
Nottingham Forest F.C. players
Harrogate Town A.F.C. players
Droylsden F.C. players
Farsley Celtic A.F.C. players
Garforth Town A.F.C. players
Curzon Ashton F.C. players
Expatriate footballers in Belgium
National League (English football) players
English sportspeople of Saint Kitts and Nevis descent
Footballers from Leeds
Black British sportspeople